The eighteenth season of The Bachelor premiered on January 6, 2014. This season features 32-year-old Juan Pablo Galavis, a former Venezuelan professional soccer player from Miami, Florida. Galavis finished in seventh place on the ninth season of The Bachelorette featuring Desiree Hartsock. He is the first Latino lead. The season concluded on March 10, 2014, with Galavis choosing to pursue a relationship with 26-year-old pediatric nurse Nikki Ferrell. They ended their relationship in October 2014.

There are 4 Sunday special episodes during the month of January 2014  as follows:
January 5 – Countdown to Juan Pablo
January 12 – Behind the Scenes of this season

Production

Casting
Casting began during the airing of the seventeenth season of the show. Galavis was instantly chosen during the season finale of The Bachelorette.

Filming and development
The season travelled to locales including Utah, South Korea, Vietnam, New Zealand, Florida, and Saint Lucia. With performances such as 2NE1, Romeo Santos, and Josh Krajcik.

Contestants
Unlike previous seasons, there are 27 contestants competing the show, for the first time since Rome. Biographical information according to ABC official series site, which gives first names only. Plus footnoted additions.

Future appearances
The Bachelorette
Andi Dorfman was chosen as the lead for the tenth season of The Bachelorette. She ended the season engaged to Josh Murray. They announced their breakup on January 8, 2015.

Clare Crawley was chosen as the lead for the sixteenth season of The Bachelorette. She got engaged to Dale Moss in the fourth episode. They broke up in January 2021, but got back together. They broke up for good in September 2021.

Bachelor in Paradise
Season 1

Crawley, Lacy Faddoul, Christy Hansen, Elise Mosca, Danielle Ronco, and Lucy Aragon returned for the first season of Bachelor in Paradise. Mosca and Crawley quit during week 3 and week 5, respectively. Ronco was eliminated during week 3, Aragon during week 5, and Hansen during week 7. Faddoul ended the season engaged to Marcus Grodd. They were later married, however, they soon split up.

Season 2

Crawley, Cassandra Ferguson, and Chelsie Webster returned for the second season of Bachelor in Paradise. Crawley was eliminated during week 3 and Webster during week 5. Ferguson ended the season in a relationship with Justin Reich. They split after Paradise.

Season 5

Ferguson returned for the fifth season of Bachelor in Paradise. She split with Jordan Mauger during week 6.

Couples Therapy
Nikki Ferrell participated in VH1 reality series Couples Therapy, along with Juan Pablo Galavis.

The Bachelor Winter Games
Crawley returned for The Bachelor Winter Games under Team USA. She quit during week 3.

Call-out order

 The contestant received the first impression rose
 The contestant received a rose during the date
 The contestant was eliminated outside the rose ceremony
 The contestant was eliminated
 The contestant was eliminated during the date
 The contestant quit the competition
 The contestant won the competition

Episodes

Notes

References

External links

2014 American television seasons
The Bachelor (American TV series) seasons
Television shows filmed in California
Television shows filmed in Utah
Television shows filmed in South Korea
Television shows filmed in Vietnam
Television shows filmed in New Zealand
Television shows filmed in Florida
Television shows filmed in Missouri
Television shows filmed in Atlanta
Television shows filmed in Saint Lucia